Garry Wayne Tallent (born October 27, 1949), sometimes billed as Garry W. Tallent, is an American musician and record producer, best known for being bass player and founding member of the E Street Band, Bruce Springsteen's primary backing band since 1972. As of 2022, and not counting Springsteen himself, Tallent is the only original member of the E Street Band remaining in the band. Tallent was inducted as a member of the E Street Band into the Rock and Roll Hall of Fame.

Biography
Growing up in Neptune City around the Jersey shore, Tallent took up first the tuba and then the bass. Tallent attended Neptune High School, together with future bandmate Vini Lopez.

He was influenced by James Jamerson, Donald "Duck" Dunn, and Paul McCartney.  He started playing with Springsteen in 1971 in two earlier bands and then was an original member of the E Street Band, who formed in 1972. His bass plays a key role in Springsteen's music (both live and in-studio). Notable Tallent bass parts can be heard on "Fire", "Prove It All Night", "Kitty's Back", and "Incident on 57th Street".  During the E Street Band's early years, he occasionally played the tuba  in concert and on record (most notably in "Wild Billy's Circus Story").

In addition to his work with Springsteen, Tallent has recorded with numerous other artists. In 1987 Tallent produced the song "Crying, Waiting, Hoping" for Marshall Crenshaw on La Bamba soundtrack.  During the long time the E Street Band was inactive in the 1990s, Tallent moved to Nashville, having an affinity for country and western and rockabilly music.  (By this point, Tallent had already long been referred to by the nickname "The Tennessee Terror", a name given to him after once driving through Tennessee briefly on a roadtrip). There he opened the MoonDog recording studio and helped start the D'Ville Record Group label.  Tallent has produced such artists as Jim Lauderdale, Kevin Gordon, and Steve Forbert.

Springsteen and the E Street Band performed on Saturday Night Live on December 12, 2020. However, Tallent opted out of the performance due to COVID-19 travel concerns. This marked the first time that Tallent had missed a show with the E Street Band. Jack Daly of the Disciples of Soul filled in for him.

References

External links
Official website
Garry Tallent biography at AllMusic
Interview with Garry Tallent at The Aquarian Weekly, Archive
Backing Up the Boss, at The Wall Street Journal, Archive

1949 births
Living people
American rock bass guitarists
American male bass guitarists
E Street Band members
Neptune High School alumni
People from Neptune City, New Jersey
Southside Johnny & The Asbury Jukes members
Jersey Shore musicians
American tubists
American male guitarists
20th-century American guitarists
21st-century tubists